Harry James Carpenter (b. Liss 20 October 1901 – d. Oxford 24 May 1993) was an English bishop and theologian. He was warden of Keble College, Oxford (1939–1956) and then 37th Bishop of Oxford (1955–1970).

Carpenter was educated at Churcher's College and Queens' College, Cambridge; and ordained after  studying at Cuddesdon College in 1928. His first post was a curacy in Leatherhead.

Carpenter married Urith Monica Trevelyan, a teacher. Their son was the biographer, writer and radio broadcaster, Humphrey Carpenter.

From 1962 to 1970, Carpenter he lived in the village of Cuddesdon, where there had historically been a bishop's palace, but his successors found this impractical and in 1978 the bishops reverted to living within the city. He initiated the ecumenical discussions which eventually resulted in the building of the Church of Christ the Cornerstone in Milton Keynes.

There is a parish school named after Carpenter in the Oxfordshire village of North Newington.

References

External links
Carpenter's appeal for new churches, March 1958
Carpenter pictured in 1969

1901 births
1993 deaths
People from Liss
People educated at Churcher's College
Alumni of Queens' College, Cambridge
Alumni of Ripon College Cuddesdon
Fellows of Keble College, Oxford
Wardens of Keble College, Oxford
Bishops of Oxford
20th-century Church of England bishops